Angelo Gozzadini (1573–1653) was a Roman Catholic prelate who served as Bishop of Civita Castellana e Orte (1621–1653) and Archbishop of Naxos (1616–1621).

Biography
Angelo Gozzadini was born in  Naxos, Greece in 1573.
On 27 Jan 1616, he was appointed during the papacy of Pope Paul V as Archbishop of Naxos.
On 14 Feb 1616, he was consecrated bishop by Pietro Aldobrandini, Archbishop of Ravenna, with Virgilio Fiorenzi, Bishop of Nocera Umbra, and Giulio Sansedoni, Bishop Emeritus of Grosseto, serving as co-consecrators. 
On 25 Oct 1621, he was appointed during the papacy of Pope Gregory XV as Archbishop (Personal Title) of Civita Castellana e Orte.
He served as Bishop of Civita Castellana e Orte until his death on 29 Mar 1653.

References

External links and additional sources
 (for Chronology of Bishops) 
 (for Chronology of Bishops) 
 (for Chronology of Bishops) 
 (for Chronology of Bishops) 

17th-century Roman Catholic archbishops in the Republic of Venice
Bishops appointed by Pope Paul V
Bishops appointed by Pope Gregory XV
1573 births
1653 deaths
People from Naxos
Roman Catholic archbishops of Naxos
17th-century Italian Roman Catholic bishops